Correne (Bredin) Taves (born February 11, 1980) was a member of the Canadian National women's Under 22 team from 1999 to 2001, and a member of the Canadian National women's senior team from 2001 to 2007. Twice, she was an alternate to the Canadian Olympic women's ice hockey team (2002 and 2006, respectively).

Playing career
Bredin competed for many years in the Western Women's Hockey League. The first team she competed with was the Edmonton Chimos from 1996 to 1998. In 1997, she was part of the Chimos squad that claimed the Canadian National women's ice hockey championship. She would help the Calgary Oval X-Treme claim several championships, including the 2004 NWHL, 2005 and 2007 WWHL, and 2007 Canadian national championships. Her final season in the WWHL came in 2007-08, when she played on the Strathmore Rockies inaugural entry in the WWHL.

In 1998, Bredin joined the NCAA's Dartmouth Big Green and finished her career as the most decorated defensive player in the school's history. Bredin broke the school record for the most career goals by a defender. As of 2011, Bredin still held the Dartmouth record for the most career goals by a defenseman with 44, the second-most career assists by a defenseman with 93 and the second-most career points by a defenseman with 137.

From 2008 to 2010, she played with the Moscow Tornado in the Russian Professional League. Bredin captured the 2009 Russian League Championship and 2010 European Champions Cup.

IIHF
As part of the IIHF Ambassador and Mentor Program, Bredin was a Hockey Canada athlete ambassador that travelled to Bratislava, Slovakia to participate in the 2011 IIHF High Performance Women's Camp from July 4–12.

Career stats
Bredin player profile from Hockey Canada:

References

1980 births
Calgary Oval X-Treme players
Canadian women's ice hockey forwards
Dartmouth Big Green women's ice hockey players
Edmonton Chimos players
Ice hockey people from Alberta
Living people
Strathmore Rockies players
HC Tornado players